Martin Schlitt (born 6 September 1966 in Limburg an der Lahn) is a German wheelchair curler.

He participated in the 2018 Winter Paralympics where German wheelchair curling team finished on eighth place.

Teams

References

External links 
 
 
 
  (video)

1966 births
Living people
German male curlers
German wheelchair curlers
German disabled sportspeople
Paralympic wheelchair curlers of Germany
Wheelchair curlers at the 2018 Winter Paralympics
People from Limburg an der Lahn
Sportspeople from Giessen (region)